The Spirit is a cable laying vessel (CLV). She is owned by Royal Boskalis Westminster N.V. She is a Bureau Veritas Hull Mach AUT UMS Dynapos AM/AT R Special Service Workboat Class.

The vessel has a 6-point mooring system (using her DP2 system). The vessel can also be beached, allowing her to do cable work onshore, she uses the Hi-plough, which is the latest in marine technology, allowing a deeper burial for the cable.

The Spirit has been used in a number of wind farm projects in the United Kingdom since 2010, the first of the offshore wind farms was Walney Wind Farm, which is separated into two units, Walney 1 + 2, also there was the London Array and West of Duddon Sands. The Spirit beached approximately 750m south of Heysham Port to lay the export cable for DONG Energy (26 & 27 June 2010). The export cable was pulled ashore in a joint effort between VolkerInfra, CM&I Marine and VBMS.

In 2013 the vessel was featured in a season 7 episode of the Canadian TV documentary series Mighty Ships.

References

2010 ships
Cable laying ships
Ships built in China